This is a list of Harlequin Romance novels containing books published by Harlequin by year. Publication began in 1949 with The Manatee by Nancy Bruff. This list contains only publications specifically within the Harlequin Romance listings.

 1949
 1950
 1951
 1952
 1953
 1954
 1955
 1956
 1957
 1958
 1959
 1960
 1961
 1962
 1963
 1964
 1965
 1966
 1967
 1968
 1969
 1970
 1971
 1972
 1973
 1974
 1975
 1976
 1977
 1978
 1979
 1980
 1981
 1982
 1983
 1984
 1985
 1986
 1987
 1988
 1989
 1990
 1991
 1992
 1993
 1994
 1995
 1996
 1997
 1998
 1999
 2000
 2001
 2002
 2003
 2004
 2005
 2006
 2007
 2008
 2009
 2010
 2011
 2012
 2013
 2014
 2015
 2016
 2017
 2018

Non-romances 
The list includes more unusual publications, such as The Pocket Purity Cook Book and Livre de cuisine Purity: petit format, which featured Purity Flour Mills publications in a smaller size. #71, titled Bouquet Knitter's Guide, is another early example of Harlequin publishing a non-romance title under their Harlequin Romance brand. Harlequin #162, titled Health, Sex And Birth Control by Percy E. Ryberg, is another example of a Harlequin book that is not a novel, but is, instead, a woman's health book. #186, titled Why Be A Sucker?, is a book for investment in Canada. #391, titled How To Get More From Your Car, is a book for car owners.

There have been several reprints given new numerical releases, despite containing the same text. Gina, by George Albert Glay, was released three times by Harlequin as #19, #112, and #287 in the series.